VIL and similar can refer to:
 Vertically integrated liquid, an estimate of the mass of precipitation within a cloud
 Flanders Institute for Logistics (VIL), a non-profit organization by the Flemish government
 The IATA code for Dakhla Airport

See also
Vill
Villus
Vile (disambiguation)